The Nesscliffe Training Area is a military training facility located near Nesscliffe in Shropshire.

History
The training area is located on and around the former Central Ammunition Depot at Nesscliffe. The CAD was fed from the Shropshire and Montgomeryshire Railway which ran through the camp and the training area. The railway was taken over by the War Department in 1940.

The bunkers once used to house ammunition are still used  in training exercises. As well as Regular and Reserve troops, Nesscliffe is used extensively by local CCF and ACF units.

The NTA is also used constantly through the year by helicopters from the Defence Helicopter Flying School at RAF Shawbury for training pilots and crew.

Despite the name of the nearby village, officials at the Ministry of Defence spell the camp and training area Nesscliff.

References

Training establishments of the British Army
Buildings and structures in Shropshire